Monica Chhelaram Patel (born 26 April 1999) is an Indian cricketer. In February 2021, Patel earned her maiden call-up to the India women's cricket team, for their limited overs matches against South Africa. She made her Women's One Day International (WODI) debut for India, against South Africa, on 7 March 2021.

References

1999 births
Living people
Indian women cricketers
India women One Day International cricketers
Cricketers from Bangalore
Karnataka women cricketers
IPL Supernovas cricketers
Gujarat Giants (WPL) cricketers